William Blundell (30 December 1866 – 28 February 1946) was an Australian cricketer. He played one first-class cricket match for Victoria in 1903.

See also
 List of Victoria first-class cricketers

References

External links
 

1866 births
1946 deaths
Australian cricketers
Victoria cricketers